List of tallest buildings in Columbia may refer to:

List of tallest buildings in Columbia, Missouri
List of tallest buildings in Columbia, South Carolina